HMAS Cessnock (FCPB 210), named for the city of Cessnock, New South Wales was a  of the Royal Australian Navy (RAN).

Design and construction

Main propulsion machinery consisted of two MTU series 538 diesel engines, which supplied  to the two propeller shafts. Exhaust was not expelled through a funnel, like most ships, but through vents below the waterline. The ship's company consisted of 22 personnel. Each patrol boat was armed with a single Bofors 40mm gun, supplemented by two .50 cal Browning machineguns and an 81 mm mortar. The mortar was removed from all ships sometime after 1988. The main weapon was originally to be two 30 mm guns on a twin-mount, but the reconditioned Bofors were selected to keep costs down; provision was made to install an updated weapon later in the class' service life, but this did not eventuate.

Cessnock was laid down by the NQEA in Cairns, Queensland on 9 March 1981, launched on 15 January 1983, and commissioned into the RAN on 5 March 1983.

Operational history
Following Cyclone Bola in 1988, Cessnock provided assistance to 30 villages across 11 islands in Vanuatu.

Fate
Cessnock was decommissioned on 23 June 2005. It was scrapped in Darwin during 2006, at a cost of $400,000 to the Australian government.

Citations

References

 The chapter is available separately as Semaphore, Issue 17, 2005 in PDF and HTML formats.

Fremantle-class patrol boats
Ships built in Queensland
1983 ships